The Fulton Base Ball Club was a pre-Negro league baseball team that played out of Charleston, South Carolina. The team was formed in the mid 1870s and operated in some form through the 1880s. In 1886 it became a member of the Southern League of Colored Base Ballists, the first African American baseball league. The team, suffering from financial difficulties, dropped out of the league in early July.

History
The Fulton Base Ball Club was a black baseball team founded in Charleston, South Carolina in the mid 1870s.

In 1886 the team joined the first professional black baseball league, the Southern League of Colored Base Ballists.

On June 18, the team played its first league game against the Georgia Champions of Atlanta. The Fultons lost the game 8–4. The game was described as an improvement for the club who had fared poorly in earlier exhibition games. The team was scheduled to continue the homestand against the Champions on June 19, 20, and 21.

On July 4, just prior to the Fulton’s first road trip, several prominent owners of the team failed to provide the sufficient funds for the team to travel to Atlanta to play the Champions. The team was reportedly in third place in the league standings. After July 4, the team did not compete in any more league games. The Southern League of Colored Base Ballists appears to have also collapsed in early August.

The team continued to play regional games. In August 1886, they played a team from Boston in the town of Camden, South Carolina.

Roster
The team roster in 1886.

 T. L. Grant - Chairman
 J. J. Young - Manager
 L. R. Clark - Secretary
 H. E. Myers - Treasurer
 Joseph Dereef - short stop / left field
 Sam Washington - right field / center field
 Steve Jones - short stop
 Edward Ryan - right field
 W. White - first base
 Geo. Washington - center field / right field
 James Smith - center field / catcher
 Smith - second base
 Smalls - second base
 William Brown - catcher
 James Williams - catcher
 Holmes - third base
 Primus P. Dennis - third base / pitcher
 Campbell - pitcher
 James Roberts - second base
 B. B. H. Smith - pitcher / left field
 Nathan H. Williams - left field / short stop / catcher / Captain
 James Coles - sub

References

Negro league baseball teams
Professional baseball teams in South Carolina
Defunct baseball teams in South Carolina
Baseball teams disestablished in 1886
Sports clubs established in the 1870s
1870s establishments in South Carolina
1886 disestablishments in South Carolina